The Fourth Amendment of the Constitution Act 1972 is an amendment to the Constitution of Ireland which lowered the voting age for all national elections and referendums in the state from twenty-one to eighteen years of age. It was approved by referendum on 7 December 1972 and signed into law on 5 January 1973.

Background
The Fourth Amendment altered Article 16 which deals with elections to Dáil Éireann (the house of representatives of the Oireachtas). However other provisions of the constitution state that anyone entitled to vote in Dáil elections is also entitled to participate in the election of the President and in referendums, so the amendment affected these votes as well. The amendment did not, however, affect the minimum age at which one could be elected to the Dáil, and this remained at twenty-one.

It was submitted to a referendum on the same day as the Fifth Amendment, which removed from the constitution reference to the "special position" of the Catholic Church and recognition of certain other named denominations.

Changes to the text
The Amendment altered the text of Article 16.1.2º in the following manner:

Deletion from Article  (removed text in bold):

Addition to Article 16.1.2 (added text in bold):

Oireachtas debate
On 16 February 1972, Brendan Corish, leader of the Labour Party, proposed a constitutional amendment as a private member's bill to lower the voting age to 18. This was opposed by the Fianna Fáil government as it did not wish to hold such a referendum until after the referendum on the proposed Third Amendment on Accession to the European Communities (which was passed on 10 May 1972).

On 28 June 1972, the Minister for Foreign Affairs Patrick Hillery moved the Fourth Amendment of the Constitution Bill 1972 on behalf of the Fianna Fáil government. At second stage, it was proposed by the Minister for Local Government Bobby Molloy. It was supported by the opposition parties Fine Gael and the Labour Party, and passed final stages in the Dáil on 11 July. It passed all stages in the Seanad on 13 July, and proceeded to a referendum on 7 December 1972.

Result

Implementation
The 19th Dáil was dissolved on 5 February 1973 and a general election was held on 28 February. However, the electoral register was updated only every 15 April, so those under 21 were unable to vote despite the amendment.  A 20-year-old student, represented by Seán MacBride, asked the High Court to postpone the election to vindicate his right to vote. He lost his case, although he was awarded his costs due to its "public importance".

Although the names of under-21s had already been added to the provisional register, it was the Electoral (Amendment) Act 1973 passed on 9 April which reduced the age limits in statute law in line with the amended constitution. The first under-21s to vote were a few graduates of the National University and Dublin University elections to the 13th Seanad.

The later Ninth Amendment passed in 1984 altered the text of Article 16.1.2º in a manner which would permit legislation to include certain people who are not citizens to be added to the register for elections to Dáil Éireann. However, the franchise for presidential elections and referendums remained restricted to Irish citizens.

See also
Suffrage
Politics of the Republic of Ireland
History of the Republic of Ireland
Constitutional amendment
December 1972 Irish constitutional referendum
Amendment XXVI to the U.S. Constitution (lowered voting age to 18)

References

External links
Fourth Amendment of the Constitution Act, 1972
Full text of the Constitution of Ireland

1972 in Irish law
1972 in Irish politics
1972 referendums
1973 in Irish law
1973 in Irish politics
04
04b
Suffrage referendums
December 1972 events in Europe
Amendment, 04
Amendment, 04
Electoral reform referendums